The Golden Shell is the highest prize given to a competing film at the San Sebastián Film Festival. It was introduced in 1957. In 1953 and 1954, the highest prize had been called the Gran Premio. In 1955 and 1956 it was replaced by the Silver Shell. Six directors have won the Golden Shell twice: American director Francis Ford Coppola (in 1969 & 1984), Spanish director Manuel Gutiérrez Aragón (in 1982 & 1986), Mexican director Arturo Ripstein (in 1993 & 2000), Spanish director Imanol Uribe (in 1994 & 1996), Iranian director Bahman Ghobadi (in 2004 & 2006), and Spanish director Isaki Lacuesta (in 2011 & 2018).

Award winners

*denotes first win for a nation

See also 

 Silver Shell for Best Director
 Silver Shell for Best Actress
 Silver Shell for Best Actor
 Donostia Award
 Sebastiane Award

References

External links
 

San Sebastián International Film Festival
Spanish film awards
Lists of films by award
International film awards
Awards established in 1957